Saltusaphidinae is a subfamily of the family Aphididae.

Genera

Tribe: Saltusaphidini
Iziphya - 
Juncobia -
Nevskya - 
Saltusaphis -
Sminthuraphis -
Strenaphis -
Subiziphya

Tribe: Thripsaphidini
Allaphis -
Neosaltusaphis -
Peltaphis -
Subsaltusaphis -
Thripsaphis

References

Aphididae
Hemiptera subfamilies